= British House of Commons (disambiguation) =

British House of Commons may refer to:

- House of Commons of Great Britain 1707–1800
- House of Commons of the United Kingdom since 1801

== See also ==
- House of Commons of England to 1707
